Miguel Ângelo Ferreira de Castro (born 10 October 1984), known as Miguel Ângelo, is a Portuguese professional footballer who plays for Clube Olímpico do Montijo as a central defender.

Club career
Born in Lisbon, Miguel Ângelo joined Sporting CP's academy at the age of 11. He made his senior debut with their reserves in the third division, then proceeded to be loaned to Casa Pia A.C. and F.C. Barreirense, the latter club competing in the Segunda Liga where he first appeared as a professional.

Miguel Ângelo spent most of his career in the second tier, amassing totals of 202 matches and 12 goals over nine seasons while representing, other than Barreirense, C.D. Trofense, Portimonense SC, F.C. Arouca, G.D. Chaves and C.D. Cova da Piedade. His Primeira Liga input consisted of 25 games with Trofense in 2008–09 (one goal, team relegation), two with C.S. Marítimo and 13 with S.C. Olhanense both in the following campaign.

Miguel Ângelo returned to division three in the summer of 2017, signing with C.D. Pinhalnovense. Two years later, he joined S.U. Sintrense.

International career
Miguel Ângelo won the first of his two caps for Portugal at under-21 level on 8 February 2005, when he played the second half of the 2–0 friendly win against the Republic of Ireland held in Rio Maior.

Club statistics

References

External links

1984 births
Living people
Footballers from Lisbon
Portuguese footballers
Association football defenders
Primeira Liga players
Liga Portugal 2 players
Segunda Divisão players
Sporting CP B players
Casa Pia A.C. players
F.C. Barreirense players
C.D. Trofense players
Portimonense S.C. players
C.S. Marítimo players
S.C. Olhanense players
F.C. Arouca players
G.D. Chaves players
C.D. Cova da Piedade players
C.D. Pinhalnovense players
S.U. Sintrense players
Clube Olímpico do Montijo players
Cypriot First Division players
APOP Kinyras FC players
Portugal youth international footballers
Portugal under-21 international footballers
Portugal B international footballers
Portuguese expatriate footballers
Expatriate footballers in Cyprus
Portuguese expatriate sportspeople in Cyprus